The SpVgg Lindau is a German football club from Lindau, Bavaria.

Overview
The club was formed on 1 August 1919 as the football department of the TSV 1850 Lindau under the leadership of Sosthenes Sailer and its first chairman Goldbrunner. The new club was put into the A-Klasse Gau Oberschwaben, where it remained in the coming years. Despite being a Bavarian club, the team always competed in neighbouring Württemberg, which it is geographically much closer to than to clubs in the Bavarian region of Schwaben where it politically belongs to.

In 1924, a new law in Germany stipulated that football clubs had to be clearly separated from other sports clubs and the team was renamed VfL Lindau, now under the leadership of Jakob Egg.

In 1928, the club achieved its first success with the championship in the A-Klasse and promotion to the Bezirksliga.

In 1934, a new football stadium was opened in town, the Städtische Stadion. To celebrate this occasion, a game between the FC Bayern Munich and SSV Ulm was organised which Bayern won 3–2.

During the years of World War II , football in Lindau actually received a boost with a large number of German soldiers stationed in town. By 1944 however, football came gradually to a halt as most of those were sent to the front line.

Football only resumed in Lindau in April 1946, with permission of the allied authorities, when the SG Lindau was formed.

Facing the rather unusual situation of having to many players, the club split in 1950 in two new ones: The ESV Lindau and SpVgg Lindau.

SpVgg Lindau was formed on 5 March 1950 in the "Gasthof Schweitzerhof", a restaurant and pub and the new club was integrated in the A-Klasse Bodensee that year. SpVgg finished on top of that league in its first year and gained promotion to the 2nd Amateurliga Oberschwaben where they played for two seasons before being relegated back down. Immediately winning promotion back to the 2nd Amateurliga, the club managed to stay there this time, achieving a championship in this league in 1961. SpVgg Lindau however failed to gain promotion to the Amateurliga Schwarzwald-Bodensee, losing its promotion matches.

The year after, the club achieved its goal, promotion to the third division Amateurliga Schwarzwald-Bodensee, on the strength of another 2nd Amateurliga championship. In 1966, the SpVgg managed to win the Württemberg Cup with a 5–3 victory over the TSG Backnang. This qualified them for the Southern German Cup where they lost 0–6 to SSV Reutlingen. In 1968, they won the cup again, this time with a 1–0 victory over     Union Böckingen.

In league football, a second place in the Amateurliga (III) in 1967 and 1973 were the greatest success the club achieved so far in its history.

With the reorganisation of league football in Germany and Baden-Württemberg, mainly the interception of the Oberliga Baden-Württemberg and the Verbandsliga Württemberg, the SpVgg found itself relegated to fourth tier, missing the qualification to the new Oberliga by only finishing 11th in the Amateurliga. Sixteen years of being a third-division outfit came to an end.

Relegated to the Landesliga, things got worse for the SpVgg Lindau in 1979–80, when the club was relegated again, to the Bezirksliga. In 1982, the club managed to correct this by winning the Bezirksliga and gaining promotion back to the Landesliga. To this league, they only belonged for two seasons, being relegated again in 1984. In 1985, the drop got even worse when the SpVgg was relegated to the seventh-tier Kreisliga A, the clubs deepest fall ever.

In 1988, the club managed to rectify this disgrace, winning the league and promoting themselves back to the Bezirksliga, largely on the strength of its goalscorer Thommes who scored 37 goals in 26 games. Nine years in this league followed, with a fourth place in 1991–92 the highlight. In 1997, the club went down again, but only for one season, where the club only suffered one defeat and won promotion comfortably.

Under coach Andreas Wagenhaus, a former East German international, the club came close to promotion with a third-place finish in the Bezirksliga in 2000, but only two years later, relegation was unavoidable again. Until the 2013–14 season, the SpVgg Lindau played in the Kreisliga A Staffel II, when it was relegated to the Kreisliga B. A title in this league in 2015–16 moved the club back up to the Kreisliga A.

The SpVgg Lindau has a somewhat unusual geographical location in German football, based only a few kilometres from the Austrian border, within view of Switzerland and Liechtenstein. It is hardly surprising then, that for its under-16s girls tournament in 2008, of the eight invited clubs three are from Germany, two each from Switzerland and Austria and one from Liechtenstein.

Honours
The club's honours:

League
 A-Klasse Oberschwaben
 Champions: 1928
 A-Klasse Bodensee (V)
 Champions: (2) 1951, 1954
 2nd Amateurliga Oberschwaben (IV)
 Champions: (2) 1961, 1962
 Amateurliga Schwarzwald-Bodensee (III)
 Runners-up: (2) 1967, 1973
 Bezirksliga (VI)
 Champions: 1982
 Kreisliga A Staffel II (VII)
 Champions: (2) 1988, 1998
 Kreisliga Bodensee B4 (X)
 Champions: 2016

Cup
 Württemberg Cup
 Winners: (2) 1966, 1968

Recent seasons
The recent season-by-season performance of the club:

 With the introduction of the Regionalligas in 1994 and the 3. Liga in 2008 as the new third tier, below the 2. Bundesliga, all leagues below dropped one tier.

DFB Cup appearances
The club has qualified for the first round of the German Cup only once:

Former players
 Karl-Heinz Mrosko, started his career with SpVgg Lindau, first and second Bundesliga player, also played for Oakland Stompers

References

External links
 Das deutsche Fußball-Archiv historical German domestic league tables 
 Württemberg amateure leagues: Tables and results
 Official team site

Football clubs in Germany
Football clubs in Bavaria
Football clubs in Baden-Württemberg
Association football clubs established in 1919
Football in Swabia (Bavaria)
1919 establishments in Germany